Martin Friedrich Hellwig (born 5 April 1949) is a German economist. He has been the director of the Max Planck Institute for Research on Collective Goods since 2004, after spending his academic career as a professor at University of Bonn (1977–1987), University of Basel (1987–1995), Harvard University (1995–1996), and University of Mannheim (1996–2004). Between 2000 and 2004 he was the head of the German . He is a fellow of the European Economic Association.

Selected publications

References

External links 
 Website at Max Planck Institute for Research on Collective Goods

1949 births
Living people
German economists
Heidelberg University alumni
Massachusetts Institute of Technology alumni
Academic staff of the University of Bonn
Academic staff of the University of Basel
Academic staff of the University of Mannheim
Fellows of the Econometric Society
Fellows of the American Academy of Arts and Sciences
Fellows of the European Economic Association
Max Planck Institute directors